Dacicus is a Latin word for "Dacian". It may also mean one of the following:

Dacicus, a Roman gold coin
CSM Dacia Orăștie, a Romanian football team that used to be named "CS Dacicus Orăștie"
Murus Dacicus, Dacian defensive wall construction method
Ludus Dacicus, an ancient Roman gladiator training school
A specific epithet used in biology for some species found in Romania:
Allogamus dacicus
Asphaeridiopus dacicus
Centromerus dacicus
Hercostomus dacicus
Hyloniscus dacicus
Lithobius dacicus
Temnostethus dacicus
Dacicus or Dacicus Maximus, Roman victory titles used by some Roman emperors

See also 
 Dacia (disambiguation)